Morning Call (U.S. title: The Strange Case of Dr. Manning) is a 1957 British thriller film, directed by Arthur Crabtree and starring Greta Gynt and Ron Randell.
Under its American title, it was distributed in the U.S. by Republic Pictures.

Plot
The rich and successful Dr. Manning is called out in the middle of the night to visit a private patient.  He never returns and the next morning his wife Annette (Gynt) finds him missing.  Soon after, she receives a ransom note demanding £5,000 for his release.  The police are alerted and soon Annette is trying to deliver the money to various drop-off points specified by the kidnapper in telephone calls to her.  The police keep watch, hoping to catch the kidnapper in the act of retrieving the money, but every attempts ends in failure as he fails to show up, realising the locations are being watched.  Annette hires a private detective Nick Logan (Randell) to make his own investigations.

Manning is found dead, and the police decide to use Annette as bait to catch his killer.  They publicise that she has heard his voice in the phone calls and will be able to identify it if she hears it again, hoping that the threat will flush him out in order to try to get her out of the way.  Logan and the police finally succeed in cornering the killer, and a surprising personal motive for his actions is discovered.

Cast
 Greta Gynt as Annette Manning
 Ron Randell as Nick Logan
 Garard Green as Gil Stevens
 Bruce Seton as Inspector Brown
 Peter Fontaine as Fred Barnes
 Virginia Keiley as Vera Clark
 Robert Raglan as Plainclothesman
 John Watson as Plainclothesman
 Brian Sunners as Freddie
 Wally Patch as Wally
 David Lander as Dr. George Manning  
 Charles Farrell as John Karver
 Fred Griffiths (actor) (Taxi Driver) (Uncredited)

Production
The film was originally cast with George Raft and Bella Darvi as the leads, but Raft reportedly pulled out, citing dissatisfaction with the script.  The producers claimed that Raft was insistent on his character having a romantic involvement with the leading lady, which they could not accept as they felt it would unbalance the plot and be seen as incongruous by audiences.  For undisclosed reasons, they also decided to let Darvi go.

References

External links 
 
 Morning Call at BFI Film & TV Database

1957 films
1950s thriller films
British thriller films
Films directed by Arthur Crabtree
British black-and-white films
1950s English-language films
1950s British films